Irem Y. Tumer is a mechanical engineer. She is Oregon State University’s vice president for research. She has served as the associate dean for research and economic development at the College of Engineering at Oregon State University. Tumer worked at the Ames Research Center from 1998 to 2006 as a research scientist and group lead of programs including intelligent systems, engineering for complex systems, aviation safety, and constellation programs. She completed her college degrees at University of Texas at Austin. She obtained a Bachelor of Science in mechanical engineering in 1991. She earned a Master of Science in Engineering in mechanical engineering in 1995. Tumer completed a Doctor of Philosophy in mechanical engineering in May 1998.

Tumer was named an ASME Fellow in 2017.

References

External links 

 

Living people
Year of birth missing (living people)
Mechanical engineers
20th-century women engineers
21st-century women engineers
Cockrell School of Engineering alumni
NASA people
Oregon State University faculty
Fellows of the American Society of Mechanical Engineers